Onychogonia is a genus of flies in the family Tachinidae.

Species
O. cervini (Bigot, 1881)
O. fissiforceps (Tothill, 1924)
O. flaviceps (Zetterstedt, 1838)
O. magna Brooks, 1944
O. melanica (Townsend, 1915)
O. suggesta (Pandellé, 1896)
O. tenuiforceps (Morrison, 1940)

References

Exoristinae
Diptera of Europe
Diptera of Asia
Diptera of North America
Tachinidae genera
Taxa named by Friedrich Moritz Brauer
Taxa named by Julius von Bergenstamm